Chiara Frugoni (4 February 1940 – 9 April 2022) was an Italian historian and academic, specialising in the Middle Ages and church history. She was awarded the Viareggio Prize in 1994 for her essay, Francesco e l'invenzione delle stimmate.

Biography
Chiara Frugoni was born in Pisa, 4 February 1940. Her father was the medievalist, Arsenio Frugoni. She spent time during childhood and youth in a sanatorium due to suffering from tuberculosis.

Frugoni graduated from Università degli studi di Roma "La Sapienza" in 1964 with a thesis entitled Il tema dei tre vivi e dei tre morti nella tradizione medievale italiana (the Three Living and the Three Dead in Italian medieval tradition), published two years later in the "Atti della Accademia Nazionale dei Lincei". In it, she searched for a working method that took equal account of both texts and images, a method she always considered important, in line with her conviction that "the image speaks". 

She married Salvatore Settis in 1965, with whom she had three children.

Awards
 1994, Viareggio Prize

Selected works 
 Una lontana città. Sentimenti e immagini nel Medioevo' (Collana Saggi n.651). Torino: Einaudi. 1983.
 
  (premio Viareggio 1994 for essays)
 Vita di un uomo: Francesco d'Assisi, Einaudi, Torino 1995, con introduzione di Jacques Le Goff.
 Due Papi per un giubileo. Celestino V, Bonifacio VIII e il primo Anno Santo, Rizzoli, Milano 2000.
 Medioevo sul naso. Occhiali, bottoni e altre invenzioni medievali, Laterza, Roma-Bari 2001.
 Da stelle a stelle. Memorie di un paese contadino, Laterza, Roma-Bari 2003 [dedicated to Solto Collina, a town in the Bergamo area]
 Civiltà dei Castelli, Ecra, Roma 2011.
 La cappella Scrovegni di Giotto a Padova con annesso DVD della Cappella, Einaudi, Torino 2005.
 Una solitudine abitata: Chiara d'Assisi, Laterza, Roma-Bari 2006.
 Il Battistero di Parma, guida ad una lettura iconografica in La cattedrale e il battistero di Parma con DVD, Einaudi, Torino 2007.
 L'affare migliore di Enrico. Giotto e la cappella Scrovegni, Einaudi, Torino 2008.
 La voce delle immagini. Pillole iconografiche dal Medioevo, Einaudi, Torino 2010.
 Le storie di San Francesco. Guida agli affreschi della Basilica superiore di Assisi, ET Saggi collana, Einaudi, 2010 
 {{cite book|title='Storia di Chiara e Francesco', in Collana Frontiere|publisher=Einaudi|location=Torino|year=2011|isbn=978-88-06-20513-3}}
 
 
 Le conseguenze di una citazione fuori posto, Edizioni Biblioteca Francescana, Milano, 2018, 
 

 Collaborations 
 Dizionario del Medioevo, with Alessandro Barbero, Laterza, Roma-Bari 1994
 Bruno Zanardi, Il cantiere di Giotto. Le storie di san Francesco ad Assisi, introduction by Federico Zeri, historic-iconographic notes by Chiara Frugoni, Skira, Milano 1996.
 Storia di un giorno in una città medioevale, with a commentary by Arsenio Frugoni, Laterza, Roma-Bari 1997.
 Medioevo. Storia di voci, racconto di immagini, with Alessandro Barbero, Laterza, Roma-Bari 1999.
 Mille e non più mille. Viaggio fra le paure di fine millennio, with Georges Duby, Rizzoli, Milano 1999.
 Senza misericordia. Il Trionfo della Morte e la Danzamacabra a Clusone, with Simone Facchinetti, Einaudi, Torino 2016, 

 Editor and contributor 
 'Lo sguardo dell'uomo. Il Medioevo', in G. Duby and M. Perrot, Storia delle donne (Laterza: Roma-Bari, 1992), pages 70-100
 'La donna nelle immagini, la donna immaginata' in La storia delle donne. Il Medioevo, edited by C. Klapisch Zuber (Laterza: Roma-Bari, 1990), pages 424-457
 
 
 
 
 'Il Villani Illustrato. Firenze e L'Italia medievale nelle 253 immagini del ms. Chigiano L VIII 296 della Biblioteca Vaticana', in Biblioteca Vaticana. Firenze: Le Lettere. 2005. p. 7-12. [included the editing of most of the commentaries on the miniatures]

 Fiction 
 Perfino le stelle devono separarsi, Milano, Feltrinelli, 2013 .
 San Francesco e il lupo, illustrations by Felice Feltracco, Milano, Feltrinelli, 2013
 San Francesco e la notte di Natale, illustrations by Felice Feltracco, Milano, Feltrinelli, 2014
 La storia della libellula coraggiosa, illustrations by Felice Feltracco, Milano, Feltrinelli, 2015
 Quando il sole si arrabbia'', illustrations by Felice Feltracco, Lucca, Cinquesensi Editore, 2017

References

External links 
 
 

 

1940 births
2022 deaths
20th-century Italian historians
21st-century Italian historians
Italian academics
Italian medievalists
Academic staff of the University of Pisa
Academic staff of the University of Rome Tor Vergata
Historians of the Catholic Church
Sapienza University of Rome alumni
Viareggio Prize winners
Italian biographers
People from Pisa